Michael Osepa (born 7 March 1991) is a Dutch basketball player who last played for Almere Sailors of the BNXT League. He was born on Curaçao and moved to the United States to play basketball.

Career
After playing college basketball for Rockhurst University in the NCAA Division III, Osepa moved to the Netherlands where he played for amateur clubs Almere Pioneers and Landslake Lions.

In September 2020, Osepa signed a contract with newly found club Almere Sailors. In the 2020–21 Dutch Basketball League, he captained Almere and averaged 8.0 points per game. On 14 July 2021, he extended his contract with the team for one more year. Later, it was announced that the Sailors withdrew and became inactive due to financial problems.

References

External links
RealGM Profile

1991 births
Living people
Almere Pioneers players
Almere Sailors players
Dutch expatriate basketball people in the United States
Dutch men's basketball players
People from Willemstad
Rockhurst Hawks men's basketball players
Shooting guards